Andrew Sarris (October 31, 1928 – June 20, 2012) was an American film critic. He was a leading proponent of the auteur theory of film criticism.

Early life
Sarris was born in Brooklyn, New York, to Greek immigrant parents, Themis (née Katavolos) and George Andrew Sarris, and grew up in Ozone Park, Queens. After attending John Adams High School in South Ozone Park (where he overlapped with Jimmy Breslin), he graduated from Columbia University in 1951 and then served for three years in the Army Signal Corps before moving to Paris for a year, where he became a friend of Jean-Luc Godard and François Truffaut. Upon returning to New York's Lower East Side, Sarris briefly pursued graduate studies at his alma mater and Teachers College, Columbia University before turning to film criticism as a vocation.

Career
After initially writing for Film Culture, he moved to The Village Voice where his first piece—a laudatory review of Psycho—was published in 1960. Later he remembered, "The Voice had all these readers—little old ladies who lived on the West Side, guys who had fought in the Spanish Civil War—and this seemed so regressive to them, to say that Hitchcock was a great artist". Around this time, he returned to Paris where he was present at the premiere of such French New Wave films such as Truffaut's Shoot the Piano Player (1960) and Godard's A Woman Is a Woman (1961). The experience expanded his view of film criticism: "To show you the dividing line in my thinking, when I did a Top Ten list for the Voice in 1958, I had a Stanley Kramer film on the list and I left off both Vertigo and Touch of Evil". He continued to write film criticism regularly until 2009 for The New York Observer, and was a professor of film at Columbia University (where he earned an M.A. in English in 1998), teaching courses in international film history, American cinema, and Alfred Hitchcock until his retirement in 2011. Sarris was a co-founder of the National Society of Film Critics.

Notes on the Auteur Theory
Sarris is generally credited with popularizing the auteur theory in the United States and coining the term in his 1962 essay, "Notes on the Auteur Theory," which critics writing in Cahiers du Cinéma had inspired. Sarris wrote the highly influential book The American Cinema: Directors and Directions 1929–1968 (1968), an opinionated assessment of films of the sound era, organized by director. The book would influence many other critics and help raise awareness of the role of the film director and, in particular, of the auteur theory. In The American Cinema, Sarris lists what he termed the "pantheon" of the 14 greatest film directors who had worked in the United States: the Americans Robert Flaherty, John Ford, D. W. Griffith, Howard Hawks, Buster Keaton, and Orson Welles; the Germans/Austrians Fritz Lang, Ernst Lubitsch, F. W. Murnau, Max Ophüls, and Josef von Sternberg; the British Charles Chaplin and Alfred Hitchcock; and the French Jean Renoir. He also identified second—and third—tier directors, downplaying the work of Billy Wilder, David Lean, and Stanley Kubrick, among others. In his 1998 book You Ain't Heard Nothing Yet: The American Talking Film, History and Memory 1927–1949, Sarris upgraded the status of Billy Wilder to pantheon level and apologized for his earlier harsh assessment in The American Cinema.

For many years, he wrote for both NY Film Bulletin and The Village Voice. During this part of his career, he was often seen as a rival to The New Yorkers Pauline Kael, who had originally attacked the auteur theory in her essay "Circles and Squares." Speaking of his long-time critical feuds with Kael, Sarris says that, oddly, "We made each other. We established a dialectic."

Legacy
In 2001, film scholar and critic Emanuel Levy edited Citizen Sarris, American Film Critic: Essays in Honor of Andrew Sarris, a collection of 39 essays by notable critics (Dave Kehr, Todd McCarthy, Gerald Perry) and filmmakers (Martin Scorsese, John Sayles, Peter Bogdanovich, Curtis Hanson) alongside fans of Sarris's works.

Film critics such as J. Hoberman, Kenneth Turan, Armond White,
Michael Phillips, and A. O. Scott have cited him as an influence. His career is discussed in For the Love of Movies: The Story of American Film Criticism, first with other critics discussing how he brought the auteur theory from France, and then by Sarris himself explaining how he applied that theory to his original review of Alfred Hitchcock's Psycho. In 1997, Camille Paglia described Sarris as her third favorite critic, praising "his acute columns during the high period of The Village Voice."

Personal life
Sarris married fellow film critic Molly Haskell in 1969; they lived on the Upper East Side of Manhattan. He died at St. Luke's Hospital in Manhattan on June 20, 2012, from an infection developed after a fall.

In The New York Observer, Sarris wrote "When people have asked me to name the greatest film of all time—in my humble opinion, of course—my instant answer has been unvarying for the past 30 years or so: Max Ophüls’ Madame de… (1953)." He added that "I usually answer questions about the greatest film of all time by immediate throwing in my own two runners-up: Mizoguchi's Ugetsu Monogatari (1953) and Renoir's La Règle du Jeu (1939). Then, if I can grasp the questioner's lapels long enough (much like Coleridge's crazed Ancient Mariner), I rattle off the rest off my all-time-ten-greatest-list: Alfred Hitchcock's Vertigo (1958), John Ford's The Searchers (1956), Orson Welles' The Magnificent Ambersons (1942), Luis Buñuel’s Belle de Jour (1967), F. W. Murnau's Sunrise (1927), Charles Chaplin's Modern Times (1936) and Buster Keaton's The General (1927)."

Criticism
Sarris's method of ranking directors in The American Cinema has been criticized as elitist and subjective. Those who do not make the cut of his 1968 Pantheon category were dismissed under categorical headings listed in the table of contents that descend as follows: The Far Side of Paradise, Fringe Benefits, Less Than Meets The Eye, Lightly Likable, Strained Seriousness, Oddities, One-Shots, and Newcomers, Subjects for Further Research, Make Way for the Clowns!, and Miscellany.

Criticism of the auteur theory often stems from a misunderstanding of its "dogmatic" nature. Endlessly reviewing and revising his opinions, Sarris defended his original article "Notes on Auteur Theory" in The American Cinema stating: "the article was written in what I thought was a modest, tentative, experimental manner, it was certainly not intended as the last word on the subject". He further stated that the auteur theory should not be considered a theory at all but rather "a collection of facts", and "a reminder of movies to be resurrected, of genres to be redeemed, of directors to be rediscovered."

Works
 The Films of Josef Von Sternberg
 The American Cinema: Directors and Directions 1929–1968
 Interviews with Film Directors
 Confessions of a Cultist
 The Primal Screen
 Politics and Cinema
 The John Ford Movie Mystery
 You Ain't Heard Nothin' Yet: The American Talking Film – History and Memory, 1927–1949
 Cahiers du Cinéma in English (editor) New York: Cahiers Publishing Co., Inc., 1966-
 Citizen Sarris: Essays in Honor of Andrew Sarris. Baltimore: Scarecrow Press, 2000.

See also
 Experimental film
 Independent film
 New Hollywood

References

External links 
 Andrew Sarris's New York Observer movie review archive
 Andrew Sarris's Top Ten Lists: 1958–2006
 Kent Jones' tribute to Sarris in Film Comment
 Profile/interview at The New York Times
 Columbia University profile
 Official Andrew Sarris tribute site
 Andrew Sarris Papers at the Rare Book and Manuscript Library, Columbia University, New York, NY

1928 births
2012 deaths
20th-century American non-fiction writers
21st-century American non-fiction writers
Accidental deaths from falls
American film critics
American people of Greek descent
Columbia College (New York) alumni
Columbia University faculty
Film theorists
Infectious disease deaths in New York (state)
John Adams High School (Queens) alumni
People from Ozone Park, Queens
Writers from Brooklyn